Nikitas Nikolis (born 16 June 2002) is a Greek professional footballer who plays as a left-back for Super League 2 club Proodeftiki.

References

2002 births
Living people
Greek footballers
Super League Greece 2 players
Olympiacos F.C. players
Association football defenders
People from Rhodes
Sportspeople from the South Aegean
21st-century Greek people